Kenneth B. Ferguson is an American politician serving as a member of the Arkansas House of Representatives from the 16th district. Elected in November 2014, he assumed office on January 12, 2015.

Education 
Ferguson earned a Bachelor of Science degree in social science from the University of Arkansas at Pine Bluff in 1973.

Career 
Ferguson began his career working for the city of Pine Bluff, Arkansas. He also served as executive director of the Arkansas Workforce Board and investment director of the Arkansas Workforce Development Board. In 2021, Ferguson was awarded the Distinguished Legislative Award by the Arkansas Municipal League.

References 

Living people
Democratic Party members of the Arkansas House of Representatives
University of Arkansas at Pine Bluff alumni
People from Pine Bluff, Arkansas
African-American state legislators in Arkansas
Year of birth missing (living people)
21st-century American politicians